The Bali people (also known as Bibaali, Maya, Ibaale, Abaali, Ibaale or Ibaali) are the communities, numbering over 100,000 people, that settled the villages of Farabaune, Tashan Gurgu, Geidam/Tamgum, Tagombali Center, Duwo, Tamwa, Badan, Kwafara, Gidan-Rimi, Tamshe, Bali, and Bomni, located on Numan-Jalingo Highway about 20 km from Numan. Others who settled in the interior are: Janawuri, Salem (Babgye), Tagombali Dutse, Tangshi, Guri, Guri Kasuwa, Dingle, Kwabak, and Ubgo (Dingle Dutse) who speak the Bali language. Presently, Bali people are found in Demsa, Numan, Mayo Belwa Local Government areas of Adamawa State and Lau Local Government area of Taraba State. Majority of the people are agriculturalist, though there are traders, herders and civil servants among them.

History
Like any other ethnic groups in Nigeria, the Bali claims that they entered the Nigeria region from the east. The Bali, for example claim that they entered the Nigerian region from the Republic of Congo and through gradual process; they came and settled in their present geographical location.  The Kpasham and Bomni denied any knowledge of distance movement. They claim that they came from Bachama land, probably from Lamurde to the area they are now occupying.  The evidence points to Republic of Congo as their original homeland.

It is not known when the people left their original settlement. Probably, the people must have left their original settlement in the 17th century by which time there was population movement in the whole of the West, East and Central Africa as a result of famine, fracidal wars and chieftaincy tussle. The Bali might have formed part of the population that migrated to the Lake Chad basin area and, later to the Upper Benue Valley. Before the declaration of the Jihad in Fombina, in 1809, Bali had already settled in their various communities and has developed village governments or better still, community governments, independent of each other.

Apart from these community governments set up by the Bali, the people also had a well-defined social and economic system which rendered their societies stable. For example, one aspect of the social life of the people is that the Bali had great respect for life. In fact, the spilling of human blood was seen as offensive to Kpan Biswi (Kpan Luh or Luwe, among the Yotti and Kpasham respectively). Most Bali believed that it was Kpan Biswi that guide and sustain their livelihood. To the Bali, therefore, life was very sacred. The birth of a child was greeted with joy not only by the parents but also by the community as a whole. The growth and development of such a child was watched carefully by the entire community.

He was trained not only by his parents and relatives alone but by the community as a whole. This made Bali child useful member of his society.
Similarly, the death of a member was mourned by all and was seen as a great loss to the entire Bali Community. In short, there was social cohesion among the Bali people before the advert of Colonialism. For instance, an attack on any of the Bali Village by the enemy was seen as an attack on all. Besides, individual farmers or other hunters assisted their colleagues in time of need, especially through communal work (Gaya in Hausa). To put it in another way, during pre-colonial period, Bali Society was quite peaceful and people were hardworking. Their quarrels were settled among them peacefully, although on rare occasions, they resort to skirmishes.
During the first decade of the 19th century, Bali Land started to experience some political, economic and social disequilibrium. The declaration of the Jihad in Fombina in 1809 by, Modibbo Adama affected not only the Bali but the whole of the Upper Benue Region. The Jihadists attempted to overrun the whole of Bali land but without success. However, one devastating   impact of this Jihad on the people is that there were population movements throughout Bali land. In the process, many of the Bali lost their children, their relatives, friends and possessions to the Jihadists. Even before the declaration of the Jihad by Moddibo Lawan on Bali people, Baliland had been under constant threats from Fulani and Bachama slave raiders.

The threats posed to the Bali by the slave raiders and the menace of the Jihadists, led to restriction of Bali social, economic and political activities. Consequently, poverty gradually started to gain inroad into the society. A missionary, Ernest Engskor who visited Bali village in the early 1930S had this to bay:
Bali appeared to us to be one of the most wretched, primitive and poverty stricken of African villages, enslaved as the people were by ancient tradition and fear of evil spirit. Our had been on exceptional and unique experience for it was almost as though these people had awakened from their sleeping beauty enhancement to discover the great world beyond their  isolated society (Enskor, 1983:179).  
The Bali was gradually tackling the problems of slave raiders and Fulbe Jihadists, when British colonial masters extended their activities to Bali land. Eventually the people were conquered and brought under the British colonial administration in 1903.

In 1903 to 1912, the whole area South of Numan Town was regarded as “closed territory”. It was not until after 1912 that Bali land, including those living in Mayo-Belwa and Lau was opened to Christian missionaries.
By the 1940s, colonialism and Christianity were deeply noted in Bali villages. Indeed, while the Christian missions, especially the United Sudan Mission (SUM) were busy softening the minds of the people they saw as “uncivilized”, the British Colonial Masters were taking their resources away for the development of their home countries. The result is that Bali was left to face acute starvation and hunger. In this[1] way, colonialism continued to destroy Bali economy, technology and self-reliant development just as the slave raiders and Jihadists had done.
This was how the whole of Baliland became a British possession at the beginning of the 20th century like any other ethnic nationality in Nigeria. Indeed, slave trade and colonialism were the major forces that set back Bali development. The slave raiders dominated Bali homeland and the British exploited Bali homeland and the British exploited Bali resources.
       
Throughout colonial period, the Bali struggled to free themselves from colonial domination. In 1913, for example, one of the Bali men short and wounded a British Touring Officer who had gone to Bali for head account. In reprisal, Bali village was attacked and destroyed by the British punitive expedition. It took the people years to build their village. But this did not stop the people from opposing the British actively or passively. On 1 October 1960, however, the Bali people together with the rest of the ethnic groups in the country gained political independence from Britain.

See also
Bali language (Adamawa)

Ethnic groups in Nigeria
Adamawa Region